I Am a Girl is a 2013 documentary that follows six girls aged between 17 and 19 from the United States, Australia, Cambodia, Afghanistan, Cameroon, and Papua New Guinea, highlighting issues of gender inequality, domestic abuse, mental health and family planning. The story is told through interviews with the girls and cinematic observational footage as they experience important events and rites of passage in their life. The film's producer and director, Rebecca Barry, is a filmmaker from Australia. The film is distributed by Women Make Movies in North America, Titan View in Australia, and TVF International in the rest of the world.

Award nominations and festivals 
I Am A Girl has been nominated for numerous awards, including the following:

Australian Academy of Cinema and Television Arts Award (2014) for Best Feature Length Documentary
Australian Academy of Cinema and Television Arts Award (2014) for Best Direction in a Documentary
Australian Academy of Cinema and Television Arts Award (2014) for Best Cinematography in a Documentary
Australian Academy of Cinema and Television Arts Award (2014) for Best Editing
Australian Directors Guild Award (2014) for Best Documentary Feature
Honorary Award at the 2013 Byron Bay International Film Festival.

I Am A Girl has been selected for the following festivals:

Breath of Fresh Air Film Festival, Australia (2013)
Through Women's Eyes Film Festival at Sarasota Film Festival, USA (2014)
 Films From the South, Norway (2014)

Reviews 
The film has been described as 'deeply inspirational and succinctly moving'. Another critic has stated that 'there are moments and images in this film that will stay with you a long time'.

References

External links 

Rebecca Barry website

Documentary films about adolescence
2013 films
2013 documentary films
Australian documentary films
2010s English-language films